Islamist insurgency in the Sahel or Jihadist Insurgencies in the Sahel refers to the Islamist insurgency in the Sahel region of West Africa following the 2011 Arab Spring to the present day. In particular, the intensive conflict in the three countries of Mali, Niger and Burkina Faso has been referred to as the Sahel War.

Background 
 
Since 2007, the al-Qaeda in the Islamic Maghreb (AQIM) have been engaging the Algerian government in an insurgency campaign in the Maghreb. 
AQIM fighters are mostly drawn from the Algerian and local Saharan communities (such as the Tuareg and the tribal clans of Mali). After the First Libyan Civil War in 2011, south-western Libya has offered sanctuaries to AQIM fighters, which dispatched cells to be established in the region.

Western Sahel

Mali

Tuareg rebellion and Malian civil war  
 
After the end of the 2011 Libyan Civil War, an influx of weaponry led to the arming of the Tuareg in their demand for greater autonomy and independence of their homeland in northern Mali, which they called  Azawad. In Libya, the Tuareg people largely supported Gaddafi during the war, Tuareg areas such as Ghat remain Gaddafi loyalist strongholds. Tuareg fighters who fought for Gadaffi began to return from Libya after war ends, citing discrimination from the new government.

In October 2011, the National Movement for the Liberation of Azawad (MNLA) was formed from rebels of previous Tuareg rebellions and fighters who have returned from Libya. Another Tuareg-dominated group, the Islamist Ansar Dine, also fought against the Malian government. However, unlike the MNLA, it does not seek independence but rather the impositions of sharia across united Mali.

In March 2012, Malian President Amadou Toumani Touré was ousted in a coup d'état over his handling of the conflict. Following the coup, Northern Mali's three largest cities: Kidal, Gao and Timbuktu were overrun by the rebels.

On 6 April 2012, the MNLA said that it had accomplished its goals and proclaimed Azawad to be independent from Mali.

The MNLA were initially backed by Ansar Dine. However, Ansar Dine and other Islamist groups, including Movement for Oneness and Jihad in West Africa (MUJAO), a splinter group of AQIM, began imposing strict Sharia law in conquered territories. They soon came into conflict with the MNLA. By July 2012, the MNLA had lost control of most of northern Mali to the Islamists.

By January 2013, Islamist forces advanced to 600 km from the capital and were closing in to capture the major town of Mopti. The MNLA began peace talks to realign with the Malian government while the French military launched Opération Serval on January 11, intervening in the conflict. French air campaign helped Malian government to push back islamist advances, allowing them to take back major cities of Timbuktu, Gao and Kidal. By the end of May 2013, Islamist and Tuareg forces have to retreat to the desert of northeastern Mali.

Foreign interventions  

Opération Serval ended in July 2014. Operation Barkhane commenced shortly after on 1 August 2014 to "assure the Sahel nations' security, and in effect France's security".

In the first days of January 2022, after several months of rumors and negotiations, several hundred Russian mercenaries from the Wagner Group were deployed in Mali, as well as soldiers from the Russian regular army.

Insurgency spreading to other countries

Niger 

The Niger faces jihadist insurgencies both in its western regions (as a result of the spillover of the Mali War) and in its southeastern region (as a result of the spillover of the Islamic insurgency in Nigeria). The insurgency in the west of the country began with incursions in 2015 and intensified from 2017 onwards. Since 2021, attacks were carried out with greater frequency in the country.

Burkina Faso  

The insurgency in the Sahel spread to Burkina Faso in 2015, beginning with a attack on a gendarmerie by alleged Boko Haram members. In 2016, the amount of attacks spiked after a new group, Ansarul Islam was founded by imam Ibrahim Malam Dicko.

In 2022, the insurgency in Burkina Faso has begun to spread to neighboring countries of Benin and Togo. On 8 February 2022, insurgents attacked the W National Park in Benin, killing nine people. On 11 May 2022, militants crossed the border into Togo and killed eight soldiers.

Boko Haram and ISWAP insurgency 
 
Having cooperated and trained alongside AQIM in the Sahel since 2006, the Nigerian Islamist group Boko Haram began expanding into Chad and Niger in 2014 after successfully seizing territory in the insurgency in Nigeria. By then controlling a significant area around Lake Chad, a coalition of Western African countries launched an offensive against the group in January 2015. The group eventually departed its alliance with al-Qaeda, pledging allegiance to ISIL in March 2015. By the end of 2015 Boko Haram had been largely pushed to retreat into the Sambisa Forest in Nigeria, although attacks have continued including in Niger.

Timeline

2012
January 16 – The start of the Mali Civil War.

2013
May 23 – Twin suicide attacks occur in Niger targeting a military base in Agadez and a uranium mine in Arlit.

2014 
December 11 – French troops in Mali killed top Islamist commander Ahmed al Tilemsi. Tilemsi was a founding member of Movement for Unity and Jihad in West Africa (MUJWA) and held a $5 million bounty.

2015 
November 20 – The al-Qaeda in the Islamic Maghreb attacked an Hotel in Bamako, the capital of Mali, killing 20 people, and taking hostage another 170.
November 28 – Ansar Dine attacked UN peacekeepers in Kidal killing 2 soldiers and one contractor.

2016 
January 15 – Gunmen armed with heavy weapons attacked the Cappuccino restaurant and the Splendid Hotel in the heart of Ouagadougou, the capital of Burkina Faso. The number of fatalities reached 30, while at least 56 were wounded; a total of 176 hostages were released after a government counter-attack into the next morning as the siege ended. Three perpetrators were also killed. The nearby YIBI hotel was then under siege, where another attacker was killed. Notably, former Swiss MPs Jean-Noël Rey and Georgie Lamon were killed. Responsibility for the attack was claimed by Al-Qaeda in the Islamic Maghreb (AQIM) and Al-Mourabitoun.
February 5 – UN base in Mali attacked by unknown Islamists.
February 11 – Suspected Islamist militants killed two civilians and a customs officer and burned a car in an attack on a customs post in Mopti, central Mali.
February 12 – Five UN peacekeepers killed in Kidal, Mali and over at least 30 wounded, from an insurgent attack.
February 15  – AQIM confirmed the death of MOJWA spokesman, Omar Ould Hamaha, in a France airstrike.
February 23  – Gunmen attacked a checkpoint southwest of the Malian town of Timbuktu overnight killing three soldiers and wounding two others.
March 1  – Its reported that France special forces conducted two separated raids killing a Spanish AQIM commander, Abu al Nour al Andalusi, and two fighters of Al-Mourabitoun.
March 6  – Ansar Dine claims four attacks across Mali, detonating three UN vehicles in Kidal, Tesslitnear, Aguelhok and an attack on a UN camp in Kidal with rockets, meanwhile defense ministers from West Africa's arid Sahel region have agreed to work together to establish special rapid reaction forces to counter the growing threat from al Qaeda and Islamic State-linked militants.
March 10  – Warring Tuareg clans in northern Mali have agreed to cease hostilities after tit-for-tat violence killed dozens of people from the start of the year. 
March 13–14 – 2016 Grand-Bassam shootings: AQIM and Al-Mourabitoun attacked the town of Grand-Bassam, in the Ivory Coast, killing at least 18 people, including 3 members of the country's special forces, and 4 European tourists. 3 of 6 assailants also killed.
March 15 – AQIM branch said its attack in the Ivory Coast on March 13 that killed 18 people was revenge for the France Operation Barkhane against Islamist militants in the Sahel region and called for its forces to withdraw. Also, Ivory Coast has raised its security alert to the highest level and President Alassane Ouattara has pledged that the country would not be "intimidated by terrorists" following the attack of March 13 that killed 18 people.
March 16 – France government said it will deploy a paramilitary police force in the capital of Burkina Faso to react quickly in the event of new attacks by Islamist militants in West Africa, after the Ivory Coast attack by AQIM.
March 19 – Three policemen were shot dead by AQIM soldiers in a Niger village near the border with Burkina Faso. One soldier was killed and two others wounded when a military convoy was attacked close to Nigeria's border by Boko Haram fighters.
March 22 – AQIM attacked a European union military training mission's headquarters in the Malian capital, Bamako, with left an insurgent dead. On the same day, the Ivory Coast arrested the suspected leader and other 15 militants of the AQIM group that conducted the beach attacks of March 13. The man is named Kounta Dallah.
March 23  – 21 AQIM suspects captured by the Mali police, in response to their attack on an EU base in Bamako.
March 27 – Two AQIM fighters arrested in Mali over Ivory Coast resort attack.
April 9 – Ansar Dine claimed two bombings on the Aguelhok-Tessalit axis just north of the city of Kidal.
April 10 – Gunmen ambushed a Malian military patrol outside of Timbuktu near the town of Gourma injuring three soldiers.
April 12 – Three French soldiers killed by an IED in northern Mali. Also 2 another Malian soldiers, and one Chadian killed by land mines.
April 22 – Mali police captured the AQIM mastermind of the terrorist attacks of November 2015 in Radisson blu hotel in Bamako. The man identified as a Mauritanian by the name of Fawaz Ould Ahmeida.
July 31 – In Timbuktu, northern Mali, a captain of the Malian army was killed by four AQIM members
September 2 – In Markoye, Burkina Faso killed ISIS members 1 border guard and a civilian.
September 9 – 3 Malian troops were killed after suspected AQIM fighters ambushed them in the centre of the country.
September 26 – In Timbuktu, Mali a Mali Military gard and his cousin were killed in their house by terrorists.
 October 3 – One Blue helmet was killed  and eight others were injured in an attack on their base in Aguelhok, Mali. AQIM claimed the attack
 October 6 – The Malian refugee camp Tazalit in the Tasara region was attack by forty assailants, presumably AQIM. Twenty people were killed (all site security forces). One refugee was injured.
 October 9 – One of the main Tuareg leaders of Mali, Cheikh Ag Awssa, military head of the High Council of Azawad (HCUA, French acronym), died Saturday when the vehicle he was traveling with his son stepped on a mine, reported today the Coordinator movements of Azawad (CMA).
 October 12 – Burkina Faso's defense ministry says heavily armed assailants have attacked a military position in the north near the Mali border, killing three soldiers and wounding another. ISIS claims responsibility for the attack.
 October 14 – An American aid worker has been kidnapped in a town northeast of Niger's capital Niamey, before being taken by his abductors to Mali, according to a security source. Armed men raided the house of the aid worker on Friday, killing his two guards before driving him off across the desert, the mayor of the town of Abalak said on Saturday.
 November 3 – A peacekeeper was killed and five others were injured when militants attacked a military base. After the shooting, a bomb exploded, killing one soldier and injuring dozens more. AQIM claims the attack.
 November 4 – A French soldier was killed and four others injured after that their truck exploded because of a land mine in the north of Kidal. Ansar Dine claimed the attack.
 November 5 – An Al-Qaeda-linked group has released a video showing the purported execution of two Malians accused of collaborating with French counter-terrorism forces in Mali.
 November 6:
 A convoy of MINUSMA was attacked in the center of Mali, about 25 kilometers north of the town of Douentza. The convoy hit a mine or an IED and the assailants are then out of hiding by opening fire. One peacekeeper died, seven others were wounded. Ansar Dine claimed the attack.
 A Togolese peacekeeper was killed along with two civilians when the convoy was attacked in Gourma, Mali. AQIM claims the attack.
 Militants attack a military base, killing a Togolese in Gourma-Rharous Cercle, Mali. AQIM claims the attack.
 Militants raided in a prison and freeing 21 prisoners. They also kidnapped a guard in Banamba, Mali. Ansar Dine claims the attack
 November 11–12 – In Gao, Mali have one of the positions of the Malian army was targeted by terrorists on motorcycle. Two soldiers were injured. Al-Mourabitoun claims the attack.
 November 13: 
 Militants attacked a military checkpoint, in Gao, Mali killing one soldier and injuring other two.
 Two people were killed in two attacks in Djibo.
 December 6 – Al-Qaeda militants attacked a prison in Niono, Mali. Two guards were injured. Dozens of prisoners have escaped.
 December 16 – 2016 Nassoumbou attack: Several dozen heavily armed gunmen attacked an army outpost near the border with Mali, leaving at least 12 soldiers dead and 2 others missing.
 December 22 – Six gunmen on motorcycles attacked Saye's military soldier in Mali and shot the gendarmes on the scene, one soldier was killed and several were wounded.
 December 24 – A Frenchwoman was abducted in the city of Gao.

2017
 January 2 – One person was killed and another was injured in two separate shooting attacks in Djibo, Burkina Faso.
 January 12 – Five Malian soldiers were killed and two others injured when their patrol hit a landmine in Mali's Segou region.
 January 18 – 2017 Gao bombing: Five suicide bombers exploded near a NATO army base in Gao, Mali. At least 65 people were killed while an unknown number of people were injured. There were no reported casualties among the NATO troops. Al-Mourabitoun claimed responsibility.
 January 24 – A peacekeeper in Mali was killed and two other peacekeepers were injured in mortar fire in Aguelhok. Al-Qaeda is suspected for the attack.
 January 30 – Two civilians were injured in a terrorist attack in Madougou, Mali.
 February 4 – Four soldiers were killed and eight others were injured in a terrorist attack in Ménaka of Mali.
 February 5 – Four Chadian soldiers were killed in a bomb attack.
 February 27 – Two police stations in Tongomayel and Baraboulé were attacked overnight by suspected jihadists. The Ansar ul Islam militant group, which has links to the Ansar Dine extremist movement in Mali, said it staged the attacks.
 March 3 – Ansar ul Islam militants on motorbikes killed two people including a school director.
 March 5 – Eleven soldiers were killed and four others were injured in an attack on a position of the Malian Army close to the border with Burkina Faso.
 March 6 – At least five Nigerien gendarmes were killed in the night during a likely terrorist attack in the Tillabéri Region.
 March 11 – The muezzin of a mosque was found butchered by a suspected jihadist in Ivory Coast.
 March 13 – Two Malian soldiers and two Malian civilians were killed in a shooting attack.
 March 28 – Two soldiers and a civilian were killed in an attack at the border with Burkina Faso. Jama'at Nasr al-Islam wal Muslimin claimed responsibility on April 1, 2017.
 April 6 – A French soldier was killed in the Sahel region, Mali after a clash with armed militants.
 April 9 – Five people were killed in an attack carried out by militants in Gargando, Mali.
 April 18: 
 Two soldiers and one civilian were injured during an attack against their UN convoy in Mali.
 Four Malian soldiers were killed when terrorists attacked their base. Sixteen other soldiers were also injured.
 May 3 – 3 rockets struck the MINUSMA Super Camp at Timbuktu Airport around leaving 1 peacekeeper dead and 9 wounded.
 May 14 – In Mali four members of the Red Cross have been abducted. The local helpers were on the road in Ténenkou in the central region of Mopti on Sunday to assess the humanitarian situation there.
 May 23 – Two peacekeepers of the United Nations Multidimensional Integrated Stabilization Mission in Mali (MINUSMA) were killed and another injured on Tuesday morning in an ambush in the northern Kidal region.
 August 13 – 2017 Ouagadougou attack.
 October 4 – An ambush in Niger near the Malian border leaves four U.S. Special Forces soldiers, five Nigerien soldiers and 21 ISGS militants dead during a joint patrol.
December 6 – US and Nigerien forces kill 11 ISGS militants in a firefight.

2018
January 27 – At least 14 Malian soldiers have been killed and 18 others wounded in an AQIM attack during which fighters briefly took control of a military camp in Soumpi, Timbuktu region. They retreated later. Two terrorists were also killed.
March 2 – 2018 Ouagadougou attacks.

2019
January 1–2 – Yirgou massacre. In northern Burkina Faso, six villagers are killed by jihadists. Koglweogo (Mossi "bush guardians") react by massacring between 49 and 210 (reports vary widely) Fula.
January 20 – AQIM claims the attack on 10 UN Mali peacekeepers due to Chad's restoration of relations with Israel.
February 6 – Five Burkina Faso gendarmes are killed in a supposed terrorist attack at Oursi in the Sahel region.
February 24 – The Burkina Faso military takes out 29 suspected militants through an air force and army operation.
March 19 – A raid in a Mali military camp leaves 16 Malian soldiers dead.
May 9 – Burkina Faso hostage rescue.
May 16 – 28 Nigerien soldiers are ambushed and killed while patrolling near the Mali border.
June 14 – An Aérospatiale Gazelle operated by the French Army Light Aviation was damaged by 7.62 mm machinegun fire and had to make an emergency landing in the town of Liptako but was then destroyed to stop it falling into enemy hands.
 July 1 – At least 18 soldiers were killed and another four were missing in action when two suicide car bombers attacked a Nigerien army outpost around the town of Inates before attempting to storm the camp. The Islamic State in the Greater Sahara is suspected of responsibility. Niger's capital Niamey is expected to host the African Union summit on July 7 and 8.
 July 11 – Ten UN peacekeepers were wounded by a roadside mine near Kidal, northern Mali.
 July 22 – Six Estonians and "around the same number" of French soldiers were wounded when suicide bombers struck a French military base in Gao.
 August 21 – Twenty-four soldiers of Burkina Faso's army were killed in an attack on a military base in the country's north. Five soldiers were ambushed and killed by militants in central Mali, near the towns of Hombori and Boni.
 August 29 – Three soldiers were killed and another seven wounded in Koro, Mali, after being attacked by militants. At least one attacker was killed.
 September 3 – A bomb planted in a bus exploded in Mopti, Mali, killing 20 civilians and wounding 15 more.
 September 8 – A food convoy and a transport truck were attacked by militants in two different incidents in northern Burkina Faso, killing at least 29 people in total.
 September 9 – Six Burkinabe police officers were ambushed and killed by suspected jihadists in Soum Province.
 September 19 – Five soldiers were killed and two were wounded in an overnight attack by unknown gunmen against a military patrol.
 September 23 – Nine people were killed after terrorists opened fire on a group of people in two locations near Bourzanga.
 September 25 – Six civilians were shot dead after armed militants stormed three villages in the city of Zimtenga.
 September 28 – Nine people were killed after terrorists stormed the village of Komsilga, while seven others were killed during another attack in Deneon. Later, a soldier was shot dead.
 September 30 – Attacks on two military posts in Mopti Region, Mali, left 38 soldiers dead and more than 60 others missing, while the posts themselves were destroyed. The attack was one of the worst to hit Mali's military in years. At least 15 militants were reportedly killed in the attack.
 October 1 – Six civilians were killed by militants in a camp for displaced people in Kangro, Burkina Faso.
 October 4 – Dolmane gold mine attack: About 20 people were killed in Soum, Burkina Faso, when militants attacked a gold mining site. Meanwhile, it was estimated that the surge of Islamist violence in Burkina Faso forced more than 300,000 people to flee the north of the country, while 2,000 schools were closed.
 October 6 – A roadside bomb exploded as a vehicle containing UN peacekeepers passed by, killing one of the peacekeepers and injuring four others. The bombing occurred in Aguelhok in northern Mali. A soldier was shot and wounded in a related incident.
 October 7 – Militants clashed with the Nigerien military in a valley in Dogondoutchi, leaving two soldiers dead and five more wounded.
 October 11 – Burkina Faso mosque attack: Armed men assaulted the Grand Mosque in Salmossi, northern Burkina Faso, killing 16 people and critically injuring two more.
 October 12 – Militants killed five officers in Sanam, in Niger's Tillaberi region.
 October 19 – Simultaneous attacks in northern Burkina Faso (in Loroum Province and Yatenga Province) left four soldiers and a police officer dead while another 11 soldiers were wounded.
 October 28 – Pobé Mengao shooting: Militants killed 16 civilians in Pobe Mengao, Burkina Faso, when the civilians refused to supply the armed Islamists with ammunition.
 November 1 – 2019 Indelimane attack: An attack on a Malian army base in Indelimane, in the country's north and near the border with Niger, left 53 soldiers and a civilian dead. The Islamic State in the Greater Sahara claimed responsibility for the attack, the worst in years.
 November 2 – The Islamic State in the Greater Sahara claimed responsibility for the death in Mali of a French soldier whose vehicle passed by an IED, which exploded. France confirmed the death.
 November 4 – An MP and deputy mayor was killed in Burkina Faso's Sahel Region by a roadside IED. Two others in his vehicle also died, while a fourth survived.
 November 6 – At least 37 people were killed and 60 more injured when militants attacked a gold mining convoy in Burkina Faso's Est Region. Although previous attacks in Burkina Faso were blamed on Al Qaeda groups, this attack bore the hallmarks of the Islamic State.
 November 18 – At least 30 Malian soldiers were killed and 23 more wounded when they were attacked by militants in the Gao region. The Malian military claimed at least 17 militants were also killed.
 November 22 – The bodies of 13 more Malian soldiers were found after the November 18 attack, which was claimed by the Islamic State in the Greater Sahara. The bodies were found in Tabankort and Infokaritene.
 November 25 – Thirteen French soldiers were killed when two helicopters collided with each other in the middle of an operation against militants in northern Mali. The accident was the worst loss for a European country in the Sahel since the beginning of anti-terrorism operations in 2013.
 December 1 – 2019 Burkina Faso church attacks: Militants attacked a church in Foutouri, Burkina Faso, killing 14 people and wounding dozens more.
 December 9 – Three soldiers and 14 militants were killed when insurgents attacked an army post in Agando, in western Tahoua, Niger.
 December 10 – At least 71 soldiers were killed, 30 more were missing, and at least 12 were wounded when militants staged a massive attack on a military base in Inates, near the border with Mali. The attack was the deadliest single incident Niger's military has ever experienced.
 December 21 – French President Emmanuel Macron announced that 33 militants were "neutralized" in a French military operation in central Mali, while also releasing two Malian gendarmes held hostage in Mopti. A militant was also arrested by the French soldiers.
 December 23 – France said it killed seven insurgents in Mopti, Mali, in its first-ever drone strike.
 December 24 – Insurgents killed seven soldiers and 35 people, mostly women, during a raid on a military outpost in Soum Province, Burkina Faso. The authorities claimed at least 80 militants were killed in the raid. Prior to the attack, Burkina security forces said they had killed about 100 fighters in several operations since November.
 December 25 – Eleven soldiers were killed when they were ambushed by militants in Hallele, Soum Province, Burkina Faso. At least five of the insurgents were also killed. Meanwhile, in southwest Niger, 14 security personnel were killed and another was missing after their convoy was attacked by gunmen in Sanam.

2020
 January 4 – Fourteen civilians were killed and four more were seriously injured when a roadside bomb exploded near their bus in Sourou Province, Burkina Faso. Many of the casualties were children returning from holidays.
 January 6 – Five soldiers were killed in a roadside bomb attack in the Alatona region of Mali.
 January 9 – At least 25 soldiers were killed when a large group of militants stormed a military base in Chinegodrar, Tillaberi, Niger. The Defense Ministry of Niger said more than 63 "terrorists" were killed during the battle. Meanwhile, a rocket attack on a base in Kidal region, Mali, wounded 20 people, including 18 UN peacekeepers.
 January 11 – The number of soldiers killed in the Chinegodrar attack in Niger two days ago rose to 89 from 25. The number of militants killed also rose to 77 from 63.
 January 20 – Insurgents killed 36 civilians during an attack on villages in Sanmatenga Province, northern Burkina Faso.
 January 21 – Two soldiers were killed by an IED in Mopti, Mali.
 January 23 – At least six soldiers were killed by militants in Dioungani, Mali.
 January 25 – Insurgents killed 39 civilians in Soum Province, northern Burkina Faso.
 January 26 – At least 20 soldiers were killed by militants during an attack on a military outpost in Segou Region, Mali. Five more were wounded. Residents reported that the fighting lasted only two hours, and that the well-armed insurgents had quickly surrounded and raided the base before withdrawing, taking captured supplies and dead comrades with them.
 February 2 – France announced it would deploy 600 more soldiers to the Sahel to fight the deteriorating security situation in the region, bringing the total up to 5,100 troops from 4,500.
 February 3 – Insurgents killed at least 18 civilians in Bani Department, northern Burkina Faso.
 February 6 – In Tillaberi, Niger, four gunmen on motorbikes opened fire on workers in a village, killing four people
 February 7 – French forces killed 30 insurgents in the Gourma and Liptako regions of Mali in the past two days.
 February 13 – Troops returned to Kidal, northern Mali, following a six-year absence, after former Tuareg rebels allowed them into the city.
 February 14 – At least 31 people were killed when armed men stormed the central Mali village of Ogossagou. Several members of a quick reaction force sent by MINUSMA to the village during the attack were wounded. On the same day, eight soldiers were killed and four more injured in an ambush in central Gao region, while a soldier was killed in an attack on a military camp in Mondoro.
 February 16 – Gunmen killed 24 people and wounded 18 more in an attack on a church in Yagha province, northern Burkina Faso. Last week, a pastor was killed and another abducted in the same province. 
 February 17 – A French soldier died in unspecified circumstances in Burkina Faso.
 February 27 – The African Union announced the deployment of an anti-terrorism force of 3,000 soldiers in the Sahel to combat the rising insecurity there.
 March 8 – At least 43 people were killed during an attack on two Fulani villages in Yatenga Province, northern Burkina Faso. The perpetrators were likely militiamen that blame the Fulani people for harboring extremist groups in the country.
 March 13 – An Italian man and a Canadian woman were released in Kidal, Mali, after being kidnapped by a militant group Burkina Faso in December 2018.
 March 19 – Militants attacked an army base in Tarkint, Gao Province, northern Mali, killing at least 29 soldiers and leaving five more wounded.
 March 25 – The Malian URD opposition leader Soumaila Cisse was abducted along with six others near Niafunké, central Mali. The abductors killed his bodyguard and wounded two more.
 March 29 – Nine people were killed when their vehicle hit a landmine in central Mali.
 March 30 – Three soldiers were killed and another three were wounded when their vehicle struck a roadside bomb in central Mali.
 April 6 – At least 25 soldiers were killed in an attack on a military base in Bamba, northern Mali.
 April 9 – President Idriss Déby of Chad said his country's troops will no longer engage in military operations abroad in order to focus on fighting militants and rebels at home. Chad is part of MNJTF, which focuses on fighting extremists in the Lake Chad region, and the G5 Sahel force, which focuses on fighting extremists in the Sahel region. Thousands of Chadian soldiers will withdraw from bases in Niger, Mali, and Nigeria by April 22.
 April 10 – Security forces allegedly executed 31 unarmed Fulani people hours after arresting them in Djibo, northern Burkina Faso.
 May 1 – A French Foreign Legion soldier died of his injuries after being wounded last week by an IED explosion on his tank in Mali.
 May 10 – At least 20 people were killed by gunmen in the Tillaberi region of southwest Niger. Meanwhile, three Chadian soldiers were killed and four more seriously wounded when their convoy hit a roadside bomb in Aguelhok, northern Mali.
 May 11 – A clash between the Burkinabe military and armed militants in Yagha Province left eight soldiers and 20 militants dead.
 May 27 – Ethnic clashes between Fulani herdsmen and Dogon tribesmen in central Mali left 27 civilians dead.
 May 28 – An attack on a rebel camp in a province in northern Burkina Faso left 10 militants and one soldier dead, according to reports.
 May 29 – An attack on a trading convoy in Loroum Province, northern Burkina Faso, left at least 15 people dead and several more wounded.
 May 30 – An aid convoy was attacked by militants near Barsalogho, northern Burkina Faso, leaving at least five civilians and five gendarmes dead.
 May 31 – Militants attacked a market in Kompienbiga, Burkina Faso, killing around 30 people before fleeing on motorbikes. Meanwhile, in the Tahoua Region of western Niger, about 50 gunmen stormed the Intikane refugee camp, killing at least three camp officials and destroying parts of the camp before fleeing.
 June 3 – The French army and local partners killed Abdelmalek Droukdel, the leader of AQIM, along with some of his associates during an operation in northern Mali. The French also stated that they were holding an ISGA leader who was captured in Mali on May 19. Meanwhile, an attack on the Fulani village of Niangassadiou in Mopti region, Mali, left 14 villagers dead.
 June 5 – An attack on the Fulani village of Binedama in Mopti region, Mali, left 29 villagers dead and the village burned down.
 June 11 – Militants in Burkina Faso attacked an Ivory Coast border post, killing 10 soldiers and wounding six more, while one militant was killed. The attack was the first on the country since the 2016 Grand-Bassam shootings.
 June 12 – Two UN peacekeepers were killed during an attack on their convoy between Tessalit and Gao in Mali's north.
 June 14 – An ambush of a convoy near Bouka Were, central Mali, left "dozens" of soldiers killed or missing. At least 24 were confirmed dead while another 12 remain missing.
 June 24 – Armed men abducted 10 aid workers distributing food in a village in the Tillaberi region of southwest Niger.
 July 1 – At least 32 civilians were killed when they were shot at by gunmen on motorbikes in an attack on four ethnic Dogon villages in central Mali's Mopti region.
 July 2 – Soldiers investigating the massacre yesterday in Mali's Mopti region were themselves attacked, leaving nine soldiers dead and two more wounded.
 July 6 – Five soldiers, a town mayor, and two "trackers" were killed when militants ambushed a convoy escorting Pensa town hall members, northern Burkina Faso. Three others also went missing.
 July 8 – A Human Rights Watch report claimed that at least 180 recently deceased corpses were found in mass graves in Djibo, northern Burkina Faso, with the watch group alleging they were killed by government forces.
 July 16 – At least 12 Dogon villagers were killed in central Mali when they were attacked by gunmen on motorcycles.
 July 20 – Two soldiers were killed and five more were wounded in an attack by militants on a Burkina Faso town in Komondjari Province.
 July 23 – A French soldier was killed during a firefight in Mali after he stepped on an explosive.
 August 2 – Twin attacks in Ségou Region, central Mali, left five soldiers dead.
 August 7 – About 20 people were killed by militants during an attack on a cattle market in Fada N'Gourma, eastern Burkina Faso.
 August 9 – Six French aidworkers and two Nigerien volunteers were killed when they were attacked by militants near Kouré, in southwest Niger.
 September 4 – An ambush on a troop convoy left 10 Malian soldiers dead in Nara, Mali.
 September 5 – Two French soldiers were killed and a third was injured when their vehicle was hit by an IED in Tessalit Province, Mali.
 September 26 – Six militia fighters were killed when jihadists attack them in Burkina.
 October 8 – 25 men were killed in Burkina Faso when unknown attackers attacked their refugee convoy separating them from the women and children and executing them.
 October 13 – 25 people including 13 soldiers when Jihadists attacked and burned down a military base in Mali then ambushed the reinforcements sent to the base.
 October 16 – 20 people were killed in a jihadist attack on three villages in Burkina Faso.
 November 12 – 14 soldiers were killed in an ambush along Tinakof-Beldiabe road in Oudalan province, Burkina Faso.
 December 28 – three French soldiers were killed when an IED hit their armored vehicle in  Mopti province, Mali.

2021 
 January 2 – 2021 Niger attacks: 105 people were killed and 75 injured in Tchombangou and Zaroumdareye villages in Tillabéri Region in Niger in a suspected Islamist attack.
 January 2 – Two French soldiers were killed and another injured when their AFV hit an IED in Menaka, Mali. 
 January 3 – Militants held a wedding hostage in Central Mali, but an airstrike was conducted on the wedding killing 20 people and leaving 27 missing.
 January 5 – Six people were killed after 100 gunmen attacked the town of Loumbila, Burkina Faso. The insurgents stole food and motorbikes and burned several buildings.
 January 13 – Four Ivorian soldiers were killed and five others wounded by an ambush conducted by armed militants. 
 February 3 – Nine Malian troops were killed and six wounded in an ambush near the village of Boni in Mali.
 March 16 – 2021 Niger attacks: 58 people were killed in Niger when armed militants attacked four vehicles carrying people that had just visited a local market at two nearby villages.
 March 21 – ISIL militants attacked a Malian army post killing at least 33 Malian soldiers.
 March 21 – 2021 Niger attacks: 141 people were killed by gunmen in Niger after series of attacks near the border with Mali. This has been called Niger's deadliest jihadist massacre.
 April 3 – ISIL militants attacked a Niger army camp close to the border with Nigeria. 5 Nigerien soldiers were killed and many more were wounded. Six soldiers were also killed when an IED was activated against Nigerien reinforcements that arrived after the exchange of gunfire.
 April 15 – Two Chadian soldiers were killed after being targeted by gunfire near the Mali-Niger border.
 April 26 – Two Spanish documentary journalists and an Irish wildlife conservationist were killed following an ambush by Nusrat al-Islam on their convoy in eastern Burkina Faso, near the Benin border. The three Europeans, David Beriáin, Roberto Fraile, and Rory Young, were initially reported missing together with a member of the Burkinabe armed forces following the attack. They were killed while filming a documentary about poaching in Pama, Burkina Faso.
 April 27 – ISIL claimed an ambush on a group of Malian soldiers in the Ansongo region. At least 3 Malian soldiers were killed in the attack.
 May 1 – A Jihadist ambush on a military patrol in the Tahoua region left 16 Nigerien soldiers dead, six injured, and one missing.  
 May 3 – Kodyel attack: jihadists attacked the village of Kodyel, Burkina Faso, killing 30 and injuring 20.
May 4 – ISIL claim responsibility for an ambush on the Malian Azawad Liberation Movement militia, leaving 18 of the militiamen dead.
May 22 – 2021 Niger attacks: ISIL attacked a Nigerien police headquarters  on the Chetimari-Maine-Soroa road, about 40 km west of Diffa, near the Nigeria-Niger border, killing a policeman.
June 4–5 – Solhan and Tadaryat massacres
June 8 – ISIL released photos of them executing 5 Christians somewhere on the Mali-Niger border. In the same release, they also showed a photo of them executing an alleged spy.
June 22 – Unknown assailants ambushed a police convoy en route to Yirgou in northern Burkina Faso, killing at least 11 police officers and leaving four others missing.
June 25 – A car bomb injured 13 UN peacekeepers stationed in a temporary base near the village of Ichagara in the Gao Region of Mali. At least six Malian soldiers were killed in a separate attack in the nearby Mopti Region.
July 12 – Ten people were killed in northern Burkina Faso, 7 of them members of a civilian defense force, and the other 3 were civilians. It is suspected that jihadists carried out the attack.
August 6 – 30 people, including 15 soldiers, were killed in several suspected jihadist attacks in northern Burkina Faso.
August 9 – More than 40 civilians were killed by jihadists in separate attacks in the villages of Karou, Ouatagouna, and Daoutegeft in northern Mali. On the same day, 15 civilians were killed during a jihadist attack in Banibangou region. 33 civilians were killed in the same area two weeks prior.
August 12 – 17 Jihadists and 5 defense volunteers were killed in an attack in Bilakoka, northern Burkina Faso.
September 24 – A French soldier was killed in an armed clash with insurgents in Mali, close to the Burkina Faso border. The gunman was also killed.
October 7 – 16 Malian soldiers were killed in a Jihadist attack in central Mali.
October 13 – A French soldier was killed following an accident that occurred during a maintenance operation in Timbuktu.
October 20 – British soldiers killed two suspected ISIS fighters after they came under fire whilst conducting a UN Peacekeeping mission on the road between Indelimone and Ménaka.
November 27 – Three Burkina Faso soldiers were killed in a Jihadist attack near the southern Ivorian border.
November 5 – At least 69 people, including the town mayor, were killed in a Jihadist attack on the village of Adab-dab village in western Niger. Local sources say that members of the ISGS launched the attack on Nigerien defence forces in the area.
November 15 – 32 people, including 28 military police officers and 4 civilians were killed in an armed attack on a gendarmerie post in north Burkina Faso.

2022
 January 22 – A French Brigadier was killed in a mortar attack on the Barkhane military camp in Gao, northern Mali.
 September 5 – At least 35 civilians were killed and 37 wounded following a suspected jihadist attack when a vehicle in the escorted supply convoy, heading to Ouagadougou, hit an improvised explosive device (IED) on the main road, between the northern towns of Djibo and Bourzanga, in the north of Burkina Faso.
 September 26 – Eleven soldiers were killed and 50 civilians are missing following a suspected jihadist ambush in the northern town of Djibo in the Gaskinde area of Soum Province of Burkina Faso. The attack also left 28 wounded, including 20 soldiers, 1 Volunteer for the Defense of the Homeland (VDP) and 7 civilians.

See also  
Insurgency in Cabo Delgado
Allied Democratic Forces insurgency
Insurgency in the Maghreb (2002–present)
Boko Haram (or ISWAP) insurgency
Sinai insurgency

References

Sahel
War on terror
Insurgencies in Africa
Wars involving the states and peoples of Africa
2010s conflicts
2020s conflicts
Wars involving Mali
Wars involving Niger
Wars involving Burkina Faso